Otiocerus is a genus of derbid planthoppers in the family Derbidae. There are about 16 described species in Otiocerus.

Species
These 16 species belong to the genus Otiocerus:

 Otiocerus abbotii Kirby, 1821 c g b
 Otiocerus amyotii Fitch, 1856 c g b
 Otiocerus breviceps Fowler, 1900 c g
 Otiocerus coquebertii Kirby, 1821 c g b
 Otiocerus fontis Fennah, 1952 c g
 Otiocerus francilloni Kirby, 1821 c g b
 Otiocerus interrupta Fowler, 1900 c g
 Otiocerus kirbyi Fitch, 1851 c g
 Otiocerus kirbyii b
 Otiocerus lyncaeste Fennah, 1952 c g
 Otiocerus reaumurii Kirby, 1821 c g b
 Otiocerus regalis Fennah, 1952 c g
 Otiocerus schoenherri Stal, 1859 c g
 Otiocerus stollii (Kirby, 1821) c g b
 Otiocerus venusta Fowler, 1900 c g
 Otiocerus wolfii Kirby, 1821 c g b

Data sources: i = ITIS, c = Catalogue of Life, g = GBIF, b = Bugguide.net

References

Further reading

External links

 

Otiocerinae
Auchenorrhyncha genera